Knights of Pythias Lodge is a historic Knights of Pythias building located at South Bend, St. Joseph County, Indiana. It was built in 1922, and is a seven-story, Commercial style brick building with terra cotta. The building features applied Classical Revival style design elements.

It was listed on the National Register of Historic Places in 1985.

References

Knights of Pythias buildings
Clubhouses on the National Register of Historic Places in Indiana
Neoclassical architecture in Indiana
Buildings and structures completed in 1922
Buildings and structures in South Bend, Indiana
National Register of Historic Places in St. Joseph County, Indiana
Chicago school architecture in Indiana
1922 establishments in Indiana